Henry Howard (21 January 1859 – 29 June 1933) was an Australian Methodist minister and writer.

Early life
Howard was born in Melbourne, the son of Henry Howard - an accountant - and his wife Mary Ann, née Graham. Howard came from a poor background, and he at first received only a primary education. When a youth he tried to speak at a church meeting and completely broke down. Next day he told the Rev. Dr Joseph Dare, the chairman of the meeting, that in view of his failure, he had resolved never to attempt public speaking again. Dr Dare replied, "I don't call that a failure, a real failure is when a man talks for an hour and says nothing". At 17 Howard became a local preacher in the Methodist Church, and in 1878 means were found to send him to Wesley College, Melbourne (under James Swanton Waugh), with which the "Provisional Theological Institution for Victoria and Tasmania" was linked. This institution had been founded for the training of men for the Methodist ministry, and afterwards became part of Queen's College, one of the colleges affiliated with the University of Melbourne.

Ministry
In 1881, Howard was given his first charge at Warragul, and subsequently officiated at Hotham (North Melbourne), Merino, Toorak, Ballarat, and Kew. In 1902 he was appointed to the Pirie Street Methodist Church at Adelaide. It was a large church capable of holding 1000 people, and for 19 years Howard filled it every Sunday, bringing to it many people from other churches who had been attracted by his preaching.

Early in 1921, he went to England and for a time was in charge of the Hampstead Wesleyan Church. A period of lecturing and occasional preaching in America followed, and in 1926 his preaching at the Fifth Avenue Presbyterian church, New York City, attracted so much notice that he was asked to become its minister. He was 67 years of age but his preaching had lost none of its vigour, and his sermons were frequently reported in the New York press. His pastorate there was a great success. In 1931 he visited Australia, and celebrated the jubilee of his ministry by preaching at Warragul where he had begun it.

Shortly after Howard return to America his health began to show signs of breaking down, an operation failed to give him relief, and he suffered much pain with great fortitude and unshaken faith. In June 1933 though obviously a very sick man he sailed to London to visit his sons, and died on 29 June 1933, two days after his arrival. He married in 1886 Sarah Jane Reynolds (died 1918). He was survived by three sons and a daughter. One of his sons, Stanford Howard, was South Australian Rhodes scholar in 1919, and was surgeon to the London general hospital at the time of his father's death. His daughter, Winifred Howard, was the author of The Vengeance of Fu Chang.

Howard was regarded as one of the greatest preachers in the history of Australian Protestantism. With minimal promotion, he was able to attract and maintain capacity congregations for more than thirty years. As an orator he used of poetry, vivid metaphors and illustrations drawn from a wide range of contemporary literature.

Works
Howard's works, based mostly on his sermons, include, The Raiment of the Soul (1907), The Summit of the Soul (1910), The Conning Tower of the Soul (1912), A Prince in the Making (1915), The Love that Lifts (1919), The Church Which is His Body (1923), The Peril of Power (1925), The Threshold (1926), Fast Hold on Faith (1927), The Beauty of Strength (1928), Where Wisdom Hides (1929), The Shepherd Psalm (1930), The Defeat of Fear (1931), Something Ere the End (1933). Of these The Raiment of the Soul and The Conning Tower of the Soul are possibly the best known. Howard's attitude to the discoveries of science was that they were manifestations of the divine in nature, and in the opening of his The Church Which is His Body he endeavours to apply the elementary principles of biology to the organized life of the Christian church.

References

1859 births
1933 deaths
Australian Methodist ministers
19th-century Methodist ministers
20th-century Methodist ministers
Wesleyan Methodists
Methodist writers
People from Melbourne